MGO may refer to:

Magnesium oxide, the chemical formula MgO
Methylglyoxal, abbreviated MGO
Metal Gear Online, a PlayStation 3 game
Master-General of the Ordnance, British military position before 1855
 Marine Gas Oil, a fuel

eo:MGO